Susan Kaying Pha is an American politician and businesswoman who is a member-elect of the Minnesota Senate for the 38th district. Elected in November 2022, she will assume office on January 3, 2023.

Early life 
Pha moved to the United States from Laos with her family as a refugee at age three. She was raised in San Diego and Fresno, California.

Career 
From 1996 to 2011, Pha worked as a real estate agent. In 2010, she founded a publishing company. Pha was elected to the St. Louis Park City Council in 2016. She was elected to the Minnesota Senate in November 2022.

References 

Living people
Democratic Party Minnesota state senators
Women state legislators in Minnesota
People from San Diego
People from Fresno, California
People from St. Louis Park, Minnesota
Year of birth missing (living people)